İslâm III Giray, (reigned 1644–54, lived 1604–1654)(Crimean Tatar: III İslâm Geray, ۳اسلام كراى) was khan of the Crimean Khanate for ten years, interrupting the reign of his brother Mehmed IV Giray. He was khan during the Khmelnytsky uprising of the Cossacks against Poland.

Ancestors and early life
He was one of the many sons of khan Selyamet I (1608–10), three of whom were khans and four of whom were fathers of khans. See Selâmet I Giray#His sons. He was preceded and followed by his younger brother Mehmed IV. None of his sons were khans. Subsequent khans were mostly descended from his brother Bahadir.

During the second reign of Canibek Giray (1628–1635) he was a captive in Poland circa 1629–1632   Under Bahadır I Giray (1637–41) he served as kalga. In 1637 or 1638 he led the Budjak Horde back to Crimea. In the winter of 1639–40 he captured 8000 Ukrainian slaves for the Turkish galleys. In 1641 Bahadir was followed by his and Islyam's brother Mehmed IV even though Islyam was older. Islyam went to Turkey and settled at a place called Sultania on the western side of the Dardanelles.

Reign
In 1644 the Ottoman Sultan dismissed Islyam's brother Mehmed IV and placed Islyam on the throne. Islyam appointed his younger brother Kyrym as kalga. As nureddin he continued Gazi, the son of his brother Mubarak. In 1651 Kyrym was killed at the Battle of Berestechko and was replaced by Gazi, the new nureddin being Islyam's younger brother Adil. Kyrym, Mubarak and Adil were all fathers of khans. Islyam is remembered as a builder and successful administrator. He tended to appoint non-nobles without antagonizing the clan leaders. For the Ukrainian rebellion see below. In 1654 he died of natural causes.

Khmelnytsky Uprising 
The Khmelnytsky Uprising of the Zaporozhian Cossacks against Poland started in January 1648 when Khmelnytsky became hetman of the Cossacks. In March Khmelnytski went to Crimea and made an anti-Polish alliance. This gave him extra cavalry, mainly under Togay Bey. The Poles tried, with occasional success, to split the alliance. Crimean horsemen accompanied Khmelnytsky on this 1648 campaign when he got almost as far as Lviv. Next year Islyam helped win the Battle of Zboriv (1649). The withdrawing Tatars were permitted to ravage the country they passed through. Some claim that Islyam was bribed by the Poles and that he ravaged mostly Cossack territory. In 1651 the Poles sent a large army and won the Battle of Beresteczko because the Tatars fled the field. Khmelnytsky went after them and was held hostage for a while by Islyam. In 1652, following the Battle of Batih, the Cossacks purchased the Polish prisoners from the Tatars and slaughtered them. Howorth says that in 1653 Islyam ravaged the country around Bar and Kaminetz and left after receiving a ransom.   Other sources have Islyam present at the Battle of Zhvanets at about the same time. In January 1654, by the Treaty of Pereyaslav, the Cossacks accepted Russian supremacy, thereby provoking the Russo-Polish War (1654–1667). Islyam died shortly after.

Source and footnotes
Henry Hoyle Howorth, History of the Mongols, 1880 (sic), Part 2, pp 547–552. Very old and possibly inaccurate in places.

1604 births
1654 deaths
Crimean Khans
17th-century rulers in Europe